The 2008–09 Stanford Cardinal women's basketball team represented Stanford University in the 2008–09 NCAA Division I women's basketball season. The Cardinal were coached by Tara VanDerveer. The Cardinal are a member of the Pacific-10 Conference and attempted to win their third NCAA championship.

Exhibition

Regular season
Nov. 30: Jillian Harmon scored 18 points in the first half as Stanford rolled to an 83-54 victory over Hawaii to finish 3-0 at the Waikiki Beach Marriott Classic. Jayne Appel added 16 points on 8-of-8 shooting and grabbed five rebounds. Sarah Boothe, a reserve, scored 14 points in the second half. With mostly backups in, Stanford went on a 28-9 run to start the second half with a 69-33 lead.
Jan. 8: The Cardinal's 112-35 win over the Washington Huskies was the largest in school and conference history. Jayne Appel had 21 points, nine rebounds and two blocked shots in only 19 minutes, Jeanette Pohlen added 16 points and eight assists. The Cardinal made 14 3-pointers on the way to the largest margin of victory in Pac-10 and program history.
Jillian Harmon added 14 points in 16 minutes of action as the Cardinal bested a 73-point win over Long Beach State from Dec. 8, 1993 (122-49) with their fourth straight victory. Sarah Morton scored seven points to lead Washington with its worst loss in school history. The points allowed were the most ever by the Huskies, who scored their fewest points since getting 30 against Portland State on Feb. 13, 1976. It was Stanford's sixth consecutive win in the series, 10th in a row at home against the Huskies in Maples Pavilion and 10th in 11 overall dating to Jan. 4, 2004.

Roster

Schedule

Player stats

Postseason

Pacific-10 Tournament
March 13:  Stanford guards hit 10 three-point shots, including four each by sophomore starter Jeanette Pohlen and freshman reserve Lindy LaRocque, as the Cardinal defeated Arizona 77-46 in the first round.  Nnemkadi Ogwumike added 15 points and Jillian Harmon 11.
March 14: Stanford defeated UCLA 73-47 in the semifinals behind Nnemkadi Ogwumike's 15 points and 10 rebounds.  Rosalyn Gold-Onwude and Sarah Boothe each scored 12 points off the bench, and Stanford opened the second half with a 20-3 run to put the game out of reach.
March 15: Kayla Pedersen had a season-high 25 points and nine rebounds as Stanford defeated Southern California 89-64 to win its sixth overall and second consecutive Pac-10 title. Pedersen, a sophomore, finished 10-for-18 from the field and was chosen as the Outstanding Player of the Tournament.  Nnemkadi Ogwumike, who along with senior Jillian Harmon was named to the All-Tournament team, had 14 points and Jeanette Pohlen added 10 points.

NCAA basketball tournament
Stanford reached the 2009 NCAA National semi-finals, losing to the eventual champion University of Connecticut (83-64).  In the first two rounds in San Diego, they beat UC Santa Barbara 74-39 and San Diego State 77-49.  In the Berkeley regionals, they defeated Ohio State 84-66 and Iowa State 74-53.

Awards and honors

Team players drafted into the WNBA
No one from the Cardinal was selected in the 2009 WNBA draft.

See also
Stanford Cardinal

References

External links
Official Site

Stanford Cardinal women's basketball seasons
Stanford
NCAA Division I women's basketball tournament Final Four seasons
Stanford